A Medicine for Melancholy (1959) is a collection of short stories by American writer  Ray Bradbury. It was first published in the UK by Hart-Davis in 1959 as The Day It Rained Forever with a slightly different list of stories. All of the included stories were previously published.

Contents
The British and American editions each had a different selection of stories, as well as ordering.

Reception
Floyd C. Gale rated the collection four stars out of five, writing that "Bradbury's touch breathes fantasy into his most prosaic items ... all have an intense emotional impact".

See also
 Ray Bradbury bibliography
 Ray Bradbury short fiction bibliography

References

External links
 
 
 
 

1959 short story collections
Fantasy short story collections
Science fiction short story collections
Short story collections by Ray Bradbury
Doubleday (publisher) books
Rupert Hart-Davis books